Shemshak is a ski resort situated to the north-east of Tehran in the Alborz mountain range.

Shemshak is the second largest ski area in Iran after Dizin and Darbansar. It came into operation in 1958. It includes two chairlifts and three surface lifts. The slopes lie at an altitude of 2,550 m to 3,050 m above sea level. The resort includes two main slopes each with a chair lift that apex at the top and several lifts. There are no lighting facilities for night skiing.

Location
Shemshak Ski Resort is located 57 kilometers northeast of the Iranian capital of Tehran, and is located in the city of Shemshak. The ski resort is about a 90-minute drive away from Tehran.

History
Skiing on Shemshak started in 1949, but it was not until 1959 when the first lift was constructed on the mountain. In 1996, after renovations on the mountain, the ski resort was recognized as an internationally acceptable course by the International Ski Federation.

Pistes
Shemshak has classically catered to more advanced skiers while Dizin has drawn beginner, intermediate and advanced skiers. The slopes are quite steep and many of the runs are mogul runs.

Ski season is usually four months from early December to late March depending on the weather with the slope open from 8:00 a.m. to 3:30 p.m. and the night slope from 4:00 p.m. to 08:00 p.m. But unfortunately, due to some problems, Shemshak ski resort has been closed for two whole years

Infrastructure

Two of the most popular residential complexes in Shemshak are the one built by ASP before the revolution and the Sepahan residence complex finished in the end of 2012 in front of the Gazoil piste. There are two hotels, four restaurants and a coffee-house.

There are coffee shops in the vicinity of the resort that serve warming hot beverages and small snacks to the worn-out skiers as well as a fully equipped supermarket where you can find everything from international snacks to local products including the dried fruits and the famous Shemshak lavashak.

See also
List of ski areas and resorts in Iran

References

Ski areas and resorts in Iran
Sport in Alborz Province
Tourist attractions in Alborz Province
Buildings and structures in Alborz Province